YMCA of Schenectady is a historic YMCA building located at Schenectady, Schenectady County, New York. It was built between 1926 and 1928, and is a four-story and basement, red brick building with cast stone detailing.  An addition was constructed in 1968.  It is nearly rectangular in plan overall – with E-shaped upper floors.  The front façade features twin main entrances and is dominated by an elevated two-story verandah with substantial wood columns.  YMCA occupied the building until 2014.

It was added to the National Register of Historic Places in 2015.

References

YMCA buildings in the United States
Clubhouses on the National Register of Historic Places in New York (state)
Buildings and structures completed in 1928
Buildings and structures in Schenectady, New York
National Register of Historic Places in Schenectady County, New York